The history of the Opera web browser began in 1994 when it was started as a research project at Telenor, the largest Norwegian telecommunications company. In 1995, the project branched out into a separate company named Opera Software ASA, with the first publicly available version released in 1996. Opera has undergone extensive changes and improvements, and introduced notable features such as Speed Dial.

Until version 2.0, the Opera browser was called MultiTorg Opera (version 1.0) and had only a limited internal release—although it was demonstrated publicly at the Third International WWW Conference in April 1995. It was known for its multiple document interface (MDI) and 'hotlist' (sidebar), which made browsing several pages at once much easier, as well as being the first browser to completely focus on adhering to the W3C standards.

In February 2013, Opera Software announced that their in-house rendering engine, Presto, would be phased out in favour of WebKit. Opera 15 saw the browser being fully rewritten, with this and subsequent releases being based on Blink and Chromium.

Elektra versions

Version 2
Version 2.0, the first public release of Opera, was released as shareware in 1996.

Due to popular demand, Opera Software showed interest in programming its browser for alternative operating systems such as Apple Macintosh, QNX and BeOS. On October 10, 1997, they launched "Project Magic", an effort to determine who would be willing to purchase a copy of their browser in their native OS, and to properly distribute funds to develop or outsource for such operating systems. On November 30, 1997 they closed voting for which operating system to develop with. Project Magic then became a news column for updates for alternative operating systems until version 4.

Version 3

Opera 3 was the first version of Opera with JavaScript support, but Java was still missing. It was released for multiple operating systems on December 31, 1997.

In 1998, Opera 3.5 was released, adding Cascading Style Sheets (CSS) support and file upload capability.

Since version 3.5, Opera has supported CSS, and Håkon Wium Lie, one of the inventors of CSS, is the CTO at Opera. Up to 6.0 Opera supported most common web standards, Netscape plugins and some other recent standards such as WAP and WML for wireless devices, but its implementation of advanced ECMAScript (of which "JavaScript" is an implementation) and the HTML Document Object Model was poor.

Version 3.6 was released on May 12, 1999. The 16-bit version of Opera for Windows 3.62 is the last version to support Windows 3.x.  Further releases would require Windows 95.

Version 4
On June 28, 2000, Opera 4 for Windows (Elektra) was released, introducing a new cross-platform core, and a new integrated email client.

Version 5

Opera 5, released on December 6, 2000, was the first version which was ad-sponsored instead of having a trial period. Version 5 also supported ICQ, but this was dropped from later versions.

Opera supported OS/2 for the first time, requiring WarpIN and Odin to be installed.

Opera 5.10 (April 2001) was the first version to recognize mouse gestures, but this feature was disabled by default.

Version 6

On November 29, 2001, Opera 6 was released with new features including Unicode support, and offering a single document interface as well as the multiple document interface allowed by previous versions.

First MSN.com controversy
On October 24, 2001, Microsoft blocked users of browsers other than Internet Explorer, including Opera, from accessing MSN.com. After accusations of monopolistic behavior, Microsoft lifted the restrictions two days later. However, as late as November 2001, Opera users were still locked out from some MSN.com content, despite Opera's ability to display the content had it been served.

Presto versions

Version 7

On January 28, 2003, Opera 7 was released, introducing the new "Presto" layout engine, with improved CSS, client-side scripting, and Document Object Model (DOM) support. Mac OS 9 support was dropped.

Version 7.0 saw Opera undergo an extensive rewrite with the faster and more powerful Presto layout engine. The new engine brought almost full support for the HTML DOM meaning that parts of, or a whole, page can be re-rendered in response to DOM and script events.

A 2004 review in The Washington Post described Opera 7.5 as being excessively complex and difficult to use. The review also criticized the free edition's use of obtrusive advertisements when other browsers such as Mozilla and Safari were offered free of charge without including advertisements.

In August 2004, Opera 7.6 began limited alpha testing. It had more advanced standards support, and introduced voice support for Opera, as well as support for Voice XML. Opera also announced a new browser for Interactive Television, which included a fit to width option Opera 8 introduced. Fit to Width is a technology that initially utilized the power of CSS, but it is now internal Opera technology. Pages are dynamically resized by making images and/or text smaller, and even removing images with specific dimensions to make it fit on any screen width, improving the experience on smaller screens dramatically. Opera 7.6 was never officially released as a final version.

On January 12, 2005, Opera Software announced that it would offer free licenses to higher education institutions, a change from the previous cost of $1,000 USD for unlimited licenses. Schools that opted for the free license included Massachusetts Institute of Technology (MIT), Harvard University, University of Oxford, Georgia Institute of Technology, and Duke University. Opera was commonly criticized for having been ad-sponsored, since this was seen as a barrier to gaining market share. In the newer versions the user was allowed a choice of generic graphical banners, or text-based targeted advertisements provided by Google based upon the page being viewed. Users could pay a license fee to remove the advertisement bar.

Second MSN.com controversy
In 2003, MSN.com was configured to present Opera browsers with a style sheet used for old versions of Microsoft Internet Explorer. Other browsers received either a style sheet tailored to them, or at least the latest Internet Explorer style sheet. The outdated style sheet that Opera received caused Opera to move a significant amount of MSN.com's content 30 pixels to the left of where it should be, distorting the page and making it appear as though there was a bug in Opera.

In response, the Opera Software company created a special "Bork" edition of Opera which displayed gibberish instead of MSN.com but not on any other web site. They said they did this to make a point about the necessity of a harmonious relationship between web browsers and web sites.

After the complaints, Microsoft changed their servers to present the latest version of Opera, version 7, with the style sheet served to the latest version of Internet Explorer, which resolved the problem. However, Microsoft continued to serve the outdated style sheet to the older Opera 6.

Hotmail controversy
In November 2004, Opera Software sent an electronic message to Microsoft, complaining that Opera users were sent an incomplete JavaScript file when using Hotmail (now Outlook.com). The incomplete file prevented Opera users from emptying their "Junk E-mail" folders. The Opera Software company later sent a physical letter to Microsoft. Nevertheless, as of February 11, 2005, Microsoft had neither replied to the messages nor corrected the issue.

Version 8

On April 19, 2005, version 8.0 was released. Besides supporting SVG Tiny, multimodal features and User JavaScript, the default user interface was cleaned up and simplified. The default home page was an improved search portal. The changes displeased a number of existing users since some advanced settings became hidden.

Version 8.0 introduced support for Scalable Vector Graphics (SVG) 1.1 Tiny. This marked the first major web browser to natively support some form of SVG.

Version 8.5 was released on September 20, 2005. Opera announced that their browser would be available free of charge and without advertisements, although the company still continued to sell support contracts. Enhancements included automatic client-side fixing of web sites that did not render correctly, and a number of security fixes.

Version 9

Version 9.0 was the first Microsoft Windows, Linux, and BSD browser to pass the Acid2 test.
This version, released on June 20, 2006, added XSLT and improved SVG to 1.1 Basic level.

This was the first version to be on the Wii.

Beta versions of Opera 9 included an Easter egg that, when triggered, affects the Acid2 test. After the page has been open for a while, the eyes of the smiley will follow the cursor around and when the user clicks on the eyes, a JavaScript alert will read "Because just passing is not enough ;)". The changes to the Acid2 code were applied using Opera's browser.js feature, and remain available in a separate User JavaScript file.

Opera introduced Widgets, small web applications, a built-in BitTorrent client, improved content blocking and a built-in tool for creating and editing search engines.
Opera also added ability to read MHTML and to save the web page as archives.

Version 9.1 (released in 2006) introduced fraud protection using technology from GeoTrust, a digital certificate provider, and PhishTank, an organization that tracks known phishing web sites.

Version 9.2, codenamed Merlin, introduced Speed Dial, 3 × 3 small thumbnails which are shown instead of a blank page.

Version 9.5, codenamed Kestrel (after the Kestrel falcon), was released to span the gap between Opera 9.2 and Opera 10. It included some of the rendering improvements due to be made in Opera 10 and also aimed to provide better integration with various operating systems. The first alpha build of Opera 9.5 was released on September 4, 2007. The first public beta was released on October 25, 2007, and the final version was released on June 12, 2008. The final release was downloaded more than 4.5 million times in the first 5 days.

Opera 9.5 has improved support for Cascading Style Sheets (CSS), including many more CSS3 selectors and the CSS2 text-shadow property. Support for other web standards was also improved. For example, Opera 9.5's Scalable Vector Graphics (SVG) implementation supports 93.8% of the W3C's SVG test suite, and built-in support for Animated Portable Network Graphics (APNG) and MathML. Opera 9.5 also supports high-security Extended Validation Certificates and added malware protection through partnership with Haute Secure.

The interface underwent a few alterations as well, using "Sharp" by default, a new skin designed to be more intuitive, though the classic skin was still available as a user preference. Screen reader support has been added back in. Opera's mail client, Opera Mail, has been updated, with an improved indexing feature and many bugfixes. Opera 9.5 also lets users save bookmarks, notes, the Personal Bar and Speed Dial settings to the Opera Link service. These preferences can then be synchronized with another Opera browser, such as a copy of Opera Mini running on a mobile phone.

Alongside the new features, Opera 9.5 had new performance improvements. For example, x64-bit editions of Opera for compatible Linux and BSD operating systems. On the other hand, SPARC Linux support has been dropped.

Version 9.6 improved Opera Link with the new opportunity to sync custom search engines and typed history. Feed preview and an updated Opera Mail client were additional changes.

Version 10
Version 10 (Peregrine) debuted in a first beta version on June 3, 2009 and scored 100/100 on the Acid3 test, but failed the smoothness criteria. There was also a preview build that scored 100/100, released on March 28, 2009. Among other features, it also came with speed optimizations, inline spell checking for forms, an auto update feature, HTML mail formatting, web fonts and SVG font support, alpha transparency support using the RGBA and HSLA color models, and an updated version of the Opera Dragonfly web debugger. Opera Turbo, a mode which uses Opera's servers as proxy servers with data compression, reducing volume of data transferred by up to 80% (depending upon content), and thus increasing speed, was introduced.

Opera 10 was officially released on September 1, 2009. Within a week of release, 10 million downloads had been recorded.

The 10.5x versions (codenamed Evenes) also came with a new JavaScript engine, Carakan, and a new graphics backend dubbed Vega (replacing the previously used Qt), that have increased its speed measurably. Then version 10.60, which Opera Software claims to be 50% faster than Opera 10.50, which also brought up new features like Geolocation, WebM support, AVG malware protection, Speed Dial improvements, etc.

Opera 10.63 is the last version to support Windows 9x and Windows NT 4.0, as later releases would require at least Windows 2000.

Version 11
Opera 11 (codenamed Kjevik) was released on December 16, 2010 with new features including extensions, tab stacking, visual mouse gestures, new installer (Windows only) and safety improvements to the address field. In addition, the content blocker list now can be synchronized through Opera Link. It also passes the Acid3 Test as of January 22, 2011.

On April 12, 2011, Opera 11.10 (codenamed Barracuda) was released. It contains many fixes "under the hood", such as improved Turbo Mode, a plug-in installation wizard and a rewritten Speed Dial. Opera 11.10 was updated to use the new Presto 2.8 Rendering Engine.

On May 18, 2011, the final version of Opera 11.11 was released with improvements to security.

On June 28, 2011, Opera 11.50 (codename Swordfish) was released.  Equipped with the rendering engine Presto 2.9.168 featuring up to 20% faster rendering of CSS and SVG, support for HTML5 tag <time>, Session History and Navigation, it also features extensions in the Speed Dial, support for password sync in Opera Link and an updated UI.

On December 6, 2011, Opera 11.60 (codename Tunny) was released. Updated with the newest rendering engine Presto 2.10.229, this update features several changes including a UI revamp of the email interface, a new address field with star feature, and several "under the hood" as new HTML5 tags and parsing implementations, full ECMAScript 5.1 support.  This version also implemented the JSON API geo-location of Google.

On January 24, 2012, Opera 11.61 was released with improvements to security and stability.

On March 27, 2012, Opera 11.62 was released with security and stability improvements, bug fixes and performance improvements.

On April 17, 2012, Opera 11.63 was released. It was a Mac-exclusive release, contrary to belief that Apple had prematurely flipped the switch, making this release available for Mac users ahead of Windows and Linux customers.

On May 10, 2012, Opera 11.64 was released, with stability, bug fixes and security improvements.

Version 12
Opera released version 12 Pre-Alpha Build 1017 on June 7, 2011. Its code name was Wahoo.
Opera 12 has hardware acceleration, support for WebGL and the new Opera Reader-feature.

On October 13, 2011, a version 12 Alpha build 1105 was released. Includes several speed and memory improvements, themes implementation, full hardware acceleration with WebGL, full ECMAScript 5.1 compliance, and a new HTML5 parser named Ragnarök.

On June 7, 2012, the RC1 version of Opera build 1448 was released. It offers native 64-bit support and out-of-process plug-ins.

On June 14, 2012, the final version of Opera 12.00 was released.

Opera 12.01, with some minor yet important security and stability upgrades, was released on August 2, 2012.

Opera 12.02 was released on August 30, 2012. It is the last version to support Windows 2000 but the succeeding versions would need at least Windows XP and Windows Server 2003.

On November 5, 2012, Opera 12.10 was released with improvements, bugfixes and security updates.

On November 20, 2012, Opera 12.11 was released. This release was mainly a stability and security improvement over the previous version.

On December 17, 2012, Opera 12.12 was released. This release is a recommended security and stability update over the previous version. It is the last version to work on XP RTM & SP1, and Server 2003 RTM.  The succeeding versions would need at least Windows XP SP2+, and Server 2003 SP1.

On January 30, 2013, Opera 12.13 was released as a recommended stability and security update. A week later, on February 5, 2013, Opera 12.14 was released after the users discovered an autoupdate crash loop bug.

On April 4, 2013, Opera 12.15 was released. This release is a recommended security and stability update over the previous version.

On July 4, 2013, Opera 12.16 was released. This release is a recommended security and stability update over the previous version.

On April 23, 2014, Opera 12.17 was released as a platform-specific security update for Windows to fix the Heartbleed bug in the installer and autoupdater of Opera. The browser itself is not threatened by Heartbleed.

On February 16, 2016, Opera 12.18 was released for the Windows platform. It adds support for elliptic curve cryptography (ECC) as well as Galois/Counter Mode (GCM) for encrypted connections to enable Opera 12 to connect to servers that don't allow other encryption modes anymore. In addition a security issue in the mail client was fixed.

Blink versions

Opera 2013

On February 12, 2013, Opera Software announced their intention to transition from their Presto layout engine to WebKit, building upon the base of the Chromium project. Opera will become a contributor to the Chromium project. After the announcement of transition from WebKit to Blink by Google, Opera confirmed it would also switch to Blink instead of WebKit.

The version identifier 13 was skipped, thought to be related to superstition, while 14 was used to refer to a WebKit-based release of Opera for Android.

On May 28, 2013, a beta version of Opera 15 containing Blink was made available for Windows and Mac computers. It removed many distinctive Opera features, including some ubiquitous features like bookmarks (with an expanded Speed Dial intended to replace this feature). The features confirmed to be restored in the near future were synchronization, theme support, geolocation, and a "feature rich" tab bar. The previously-bundled M2 email client was released as a standalone application, Opera Mail. Extensions for the previous browser versions are no longer supported; instead developers are provided with facilities for converting old extensions to Chrome extensions, supported in Opera 15.

On July 2, 2013, the final version of Opera 15.0 was released. This release was not pushed through the automatic update system, as it was deemed some features important to current users had yet to be implemented.

On July 19, 2013, Opera 16 entered the Next stream. This build included the return of geolocation support and automatic form filling, and added a flags page allowing experimental features to be enabled.

On August 27, 2013, Opera 16 was released.

On August 8, 2013, Opera 17 entered the Developer stream, reintroducing rocker gestures, tab pinning, start-up options, and search engine management.

On September 6, 2013, Opera 17 transitioned from the Developer stream to the Next stream in anticipation of its impending release.

On October 8, 2013, Opera 17 was released.

On September 11, 2013, Opera 18 entered the Developer stream, with initial features including tab management, theme support and engine updates.
On November 19, 2013, Opera 18 was released.

On October 24, 2013, Opera 19 entered the Developer stream. The final release was released on January 28, 2014, with features including the new bookmarks bar, extended theme support and an additional level of settings for hardcore users.

Opera 2014

Opera 20 was released on March 4, 2014, based on Chromium 33. Speed dial entries were made resizeable and support was added for dragging tabs to the bookmarks bar. This was the last version for processors without SSE2 instructions. Stash screenshots were also improved.

Opera 21 was released on May 6, 2014, based on Chromium 34, and using Chromium's Aura UI framework. A broken padlock is now shown when sites present invalid security certificates and an option to display the full URL in the address bar was added.

Opera 22 was released on June 3, 2014, based on Chromium 35. Support for high DPI displays was improved and the default theme was changed.

Opera 23 was released on July 22, 2014, based on Chromium 36. A heart menu was added to the address bar, allowing the current page to be added to Speed Dial, Stash, or the bookmarks bar. An option to load insecure content on secure sites was also added.

Opera 24 was released on September 2, 2014, based on Chromium 37. This release introduced tab previews, which are displayed when tabs are hovered. It also included several improvements specific to Windows: the frame of private windows was darkened and support for high DPI displays was improved again.

Opera 25 was released on October 15, 2014, based on Chromium 38. This release introduced a visual bookmark manager and the inclusion of a built-in PDF viewer. Support for desktop notifications was added. This was the last release to support Mac OS X 10.6, with later releases requiring Mac OS X 10.7 or later.

Opera 26 was released on December 3, 2014, based on Chromium 39. This is the first new stable version on Linux since 12.16, released on July 4, 2013. This version introduced the ability to import data from other browsers, including bookmarks and passwords. It also features the ability to share selected bookmarks via a URL, and integrated a print preview. Bing was removed from the default search engine list, and can thus no longer be set as the default. This release also transitioned the Mac version of Opera to the 64-bit architecture.

Opera 2015

Opera 27 was released on January 27, 2015, based on Chromium 40. A tab menu was added on the right of the tab bar, which displays all opened tabs in a list. Hovering the cursor over a name in the list and it shows a preview of the selected tab. Reorganised the navigation on the start page. Includes additional bug-fixes for the PPAPI plugin support and the bookmark manager.

Opera 28 was released on March 10, 2015, based on Chromium 41. Starting with this version, bookmarks can be synchronized between Opera on the desktop, Opera Mobile on Android and Opera Mini on Android and iOS. Support for batch operation was added to the bookmark manager and bookmark suggestions now appear when typing in the address bar.

Opera 29 was released on April 28, 2015, based on Chromium 42. Among the features added in this release were an improved start page look, an improved history manager, the sync of open tabs, sync and manage Speed Dial start pages, an audio indicator on the tab bar, custom keyboard shortcuts and more mouse gestures.

Opera 30 was released on June 9, 2015, based on Chromium 43.

Opera 31 was released on August 4, 2015, based on Chromium 44.

Opera 32 was released on September 15, 2015, based on Chromium 45.  When you access a website using Silverlight, it gives a message that the Microsoft Silverlight plugin will soon no longer be supported.

Opera 33 was released on October 27, 2015, based on Chromium 46. Microsoft Silverlight and NPAPI still work and the message from Opera 32 is no longer displayed.

Opera 34 was released on December 8, 2015, based on Chromium 47.

Opera 2016

Opera 35 was released on February 2, 2016, based on Chromium 48.

Opera 36 was released on March 15, 2016, and was based on Chromium 49. It is the last version to support Windows XP, Windows Server 2003, Windows Vista, and Windows Server 2008. The succeeding versions would need at least Windows 7, and Windows Server 2008 R2.

Opera 37 was released on May 4, 2016, based on Chromium 50. It was the last version that would run under  Mac OS X 10.7 and OS X 10.8. The succeeding versions would need at least OS X 10.9.

Opera 38 was released on June 8, 2016, based on Chromium 51. Free unlimited VPN service from Opera was added.

Opera 39 was released on August 2, 2016, based on Chromium 52.

Opera 40 was released on September 20, 2016, based on Chromium 53.

Opera 41 was released on October 25, 2016, based on Chromium 54.

Opera 42 was released on December 13, 2016, based on Chromium 55.

Opera 2017

Opera 43 was released on February 7, 2017, based on Chromium 56.

Opera 44 was released on March 22, 2017, based on Chromium 57.

Opera 45 was released on May 10, 2017, based on Chromium 58, and comes with a slightly overhauled user interface and an integrated messenger sidebar supporting Facebook Messenger, WhatsApp, and Telegram It was the last version that would run under Linux 32-bit, with later versions requiring Linux 64-bit.

Opera 46 was released on June 22, 2017, based on Chromium 59. It includes support for APNG, a feature which was lost upon switching the layout engine in 2013.

Opera 47 was released on August 9, 2017, based on Chromium 60.

Opera 48 was released on September 27, 2017, based on Chromium 61.

Opera 49 was released on November 8, 2017, based on Chromium 62. It was the last version that would run under OS X 10.9. The succeeding versions would need at least OS X 10.10. It includes support for VR.

Opera 2018

Opera 50 was released on January 4, 2018, based on Chromium 63. It introduces anti-Bitcoin mining tool.

Opera 51 was released on February 7, 2018, based on Chromium 64.

Opera 52 was released on March 22, 2018, based on Chromium 65.

Opera 53 was released on May 10, 2018, based on Chromium 66.

Opera 54 was released on June 28, 2018, based on Chromium 67.

Opera 55 was released on August 16, 2018, based on Chromium 68.

Opera 56 was released on September 25, 2018, based on Chromium 69.

Opera 57 was released on November 28, 2018, based on Chromium 70.

Opera 2019

Opera 58 was released on January 23, 2019, based on Chromium 71.

Opera 60 was released on April 9, 2019, based on Chromium 73. Opera 59, based on Chromium 72 was skipped.

Opera 62 was released on June 27, 2019, based on Chromium 75. Opera 61, based on Chromium 74 was skipped.

Opera 63 was released on August 20, 2019, based on Chromium 76. It was the last version that would run under OS X 10.10, with later versions requiring OS X 10.11 or later.

Opera 64 was released on October 8, 2019, based on Chromium 77.

Opera 65 was released on November 14, 2019, based on Chromium 78.

Opera 2020

Opera 66 was released on January 8, 2020, based on Chromium 79.

Opera 67 was released on February 25, 2020, based on Chromium 80.

Opera 68 was released on April 22, 2020, based on Chromium 81.

Opera 69 was released on June 24, 2020, based on Chromium 83.

Opera 70 was released on July 28, 2020, based on Chromium 84.

Opera 71 was released on September 15, 2020, based on Chromium 85.

Opera 72 was released on October 21, 2020, based on Chromium 86.

Opera 73 was released on December 9, 2020, based on Chromium 87.

Opera 2021

Opera 74 was released on February 2, 2021, based on Chromium 88.

Opera 75 was released on March 24, 2021, based on Chromium 89.

Opera 76 was released on April 28, 2021, based on Chromium 90.

Opera 77 was released on June 24, 2021, based on Chromium 91. This version introduced many major features.

Opera 78 was released on August 3, 2021, based on Chromium 92.

Opera 79 was released on September 14, 2021, based on Chromium 93.

Opera 80 was released on October 5, 2021, based on Chromium 94.

Opera 81 was released on November 4, 2021, based on Chromium 95.

Opera 82 was released on December 2, 2021, based on Chromium 96.

Opera 2022
Opera 83 was released on January 19, 2022, based on Chromium 97.

Opera 84 was released on February 16, 2022, based on Chromium 98.

Opera 85 was released on March 23, 2022, based on Chromium 99.

Opera 86 was released on April 20, 2022, based on Chromium 100.

Opera 87 was released on May 17, 2022, based on Chromium 101.

Opera 88 was released on June 8, 2022, based on Chromium 102.

Opera 89 was released on July 7, 2022, based on Chromium 103. It was last version that would run under OS X 10.11 and MacOS 10.12, with later versions requiring MacOS 10.13 or later.

Opera 90 was released on August 18, 2022, based on Chromium 104.

Opera 91 was released on September 14, 2022, based on Chromium 105.

Opera 92 was released on October 19, 2022, based on Chromium 106.

Opera 93 was released on November 17, 2022, based on Chromium 107.

Opera 94 was released on December 15, 2022, based on Chromium 108.

Opera 2023

Opera 95 was released on February 1, 2023, based on Chromium 109. It is the last version to support Windows 7, Windows 8, Windows 8.1, Windows Server 2008 R2, Windows Server 2012 and Windows Server 2012 R2. The succeeding versions would need at least Windows 10, and Windows Server 2016.

Opera 96 was released on February 22, 2023, based on Chromium 110.

Timeline of releases

Release compatibility

Notes
  Windows 10 is only for IA-32 and x64, not for ARM64 and ARMv7.
  Only x86-64 builds of Opera for Mac are available at this time. ARM64 builds should soon be available as the Apple transition to ARM processors continues.

Sources:

Mobile release compatibility

Discontinued versions for devices

Opera Mobile Classic 
Opera Mobile Classic, formerly called Opera Mobile, is an edition of Opera designed for smartphones and personal digital assistants (PDAs). The first version of Opera Mobile Classic was released in 2000 for the Psion Series 7 and NetBook, with a port to the Windows Mobile platform coming in 2004. One of Opera Mobile Classic's major features is the ability to dynamically reformat web pages to better fit the handheld's display using small screen rendering technology. Alternatively, the user may use page zooming for a closer or broader look. However, Opera Mobile's user interface has come under fire for being difficult to use or customize. Opera Mobile Classic was replaced by Opera browser for Android.

Internet Channel for Wii 
Internet Channel is a web browser for Nintendo's Wii gaming console made by Opera Software and Nintendo. Internet Channel was free to download from its release on 12 April 2007 until 30 June 2007. After that date, Wii users had to pay 500 Wii Points to download it. However, in late August / early September of the year 2009, the Internet Channel was once again available to download for free and those who paid for the service had their Wii Points returned in the form of a free NES Virtual Console game. Scott Hedrick, an executive of the Opera Software company, explained that the Wii browser was designed to suit a "living room environment". In contrast to Opera's appearance on computer monitors, fonts are larger and the interface is simplified for easier use. Notwithstanding the changes in design, the Wii browser supports the same web standards as the desktop version of Opera 9, including passing the Acid2 test.

Nintendo DS Browser 
Nintendo DS Browser is an edition of Opera for the Nintendo DS handheld gaming system. The Nintendo DS Browser was released in Japan on 24 July 2006, in Europe on 6 October 2006, and in North America on 4 June 2007.

The Nintendo DS Browser includes the same small screen rendering and page zooming technology present in Opera Mobile. It also includes handwriting recognition software and an on-screen keyboard to enable user input. Additionally, Nintendo partnered with Astaro Internet Security to provide web filtering for the Nintendo DS Browser. The technology is simply a professionally maintained proxy server that blocks web sites related to pornography, discrimination, security hacking, software piracy, violence, gambling, illegal drugs, alcohol, tobacco, dating, weapons, abortion, and other content that Nintendo deems objectionable. Users can configure the Nintendo DS Browser to receive web pages through this proxy server, and this setting can be password-protected (by a parent, for example) to prevent circumvention.
In August 2007, the Nintendo DS Browser was quietly discontinued in North America.

References

External links

 Opera archive
 Opera custom download
 Opera version history
 evolt.org – Browser Archive
 Opera Resources

Opera Software
Opera
Opera